The sound system of Norwegian resembles that of Swedish. There is considerable variation among the dialects, and all pronunciations are considered by official policy to be equally correct – there is no official spoken standard, although it can be said that Eastern Norwegian Bokmål speech (not Norwegian Bokmål in general) has an unofficial spoken standard, called Urban East Norwegian or Standard East Norwegian, loosely based on the speech of the literate classes of the Oslo area. This variant is the most common one taught to foreign students.

Despite there being no official standard variety of Norwegian, Urban East Norwegian has traditionally been used in public venues such as theatre and TV, although today local dialects are used extensively in spoken and visual media.

The background for this lack of agreement is that after the dissolution of Denmark–Norway in 1814, the upper classes would speak in what was perceived as the Danish language, which gradually fell out of favour with the rise of Norwegian romantic nationalism. In addition, Bergen, not Oslo, was the larger and more influential city in Norway until the 19th century. See the article on the Norwegian language conflict for further information.

Unless noted otherwise, this article describes the phonology of Urban East Norwegian. The spelling is always Bokmål.

Consonants

  are laminal , either alveolar  or denti-alveolar .
  are aspirated fully voiceless , whereas  are unaspirated, either fully voiceless  or partially voiced . After  within the same syllable, only unaspirated voiceless stops occur.
  is dentalized laminal alveolar  or (uncommonly) non-retracted apical alveolar .
  is pronounced with protruded lips . The degree of protrusion depends on the rounding of the following vowel.
  is a (usually voiceless) fricative. The friction is normally glottal , but sometimes it is dorsal: palatal  when near front vowels, velar  near back vowels. It can be voiced  between two voiced sounds.
  are partially voiced or fully voiceless  when they occur after  (but not when  precedes within the same syllable). The flap  is also partially voiced or fully voiceless when it occurs postvocalically before .
 The approximants  may be realized as fricatives :
  is sometimes a fricative, especially before a pause and in emphatic pronunciation.
 There is not an agreement about the frequency of occurrence of the fricative allophone of :
  states that  is sometimes a fricative.
  states that the fricative variant of  occurs often, especially before and after close vowels and in energetic pronunciation.
  is in the process of changing from laminal denti-alveolar  to apical alveolar , which leads to neutralization with the retroflex allophone . Laminal realization is still possible before vowels, after front and close vowels and after consonants that are not coronal, and is obligatory after . A velarized laminal  occurs after mid back vowels , open back vowels , and sometimes also after the close back vowels . However,  states that at least in Oslo, the laminal variant is not velarized, and the difference is only between an apical and a laminal realization.
  is a voiced apical alveolar flap . It is occasionally trilled , e.g. in emphatic speech.
 Retroflex allophones  have been variously described as apical alveolar  and apical postalveolar .
  are velar, whereas  is palatal. 
  may be palatal , but is often alveolo-palatal  instead. It is unstable in many dialects, and younger speakers in Bergen, Stavanger and Oslo merge  with  into .
 Glottal stop  may be inserted before word-initial vowels. In very emphatic speech, it can also be inserted word-medially in stressed syllables beginning with a vowel.

Most of the retroflex (and postalveolar) consonants are mutations of +any other alveolar/dental consonant; rn  > , rt  > , rl  > , rs  > , etc.  across word boundaries (sandhi), in loanwords and in a group of primarily literary words may be pronounced , e.g., but it may also be pronounced  in some dialects. Most of the dialects in Eastern, Central and Northern Norway use the retroflex consonants. Most Southern and Western dialects do not have these retroflex sounds; in these areas a guttural realization of the  phoneme is commonplace, and seems to be expanding. Depending on phonetic context voiceless or voiced uvular fricatives are used. (See map at right.) Other possible pronunciations include a uvular approximant  or, more rarely, a uvular trill . There is, however, a small number of dialects that use both the uvular  and the retroflex allophones.

It is supposedly non-existent in most Western and Northern dialects. 'farm' and   'crazy' in many Eastern Norwegian dialects. Although  traditionally an Eastern Norwegian dialect phenomenon, it was considered vulgar, and for a long time it was avoided. Nowadays it is considered standard in the Eastern and Central Norwegian dialects, but is still clearly avoided in high-prestige sociolects or standardized speech.

According to Nina Grønnum,  in Trøndersk is actually a postalveolar lateral flap .

Vowels

 Unless preceding another vowel within the same word, all unstressed vowels are short.
Among the three vowels, only  has an unambiguous spelling  (alongside the ambiguous ). Many words that have the mid  (such as   'around' and   'up') in the south-eastern part of Norway have the close  in other dialects: .
For this reason, in this article it is treated as a separate phoneme that can only occur in unstressed non-initial syllables.
His analysis requires positing an additional phoneme  (which corresponds to the central , not back ) to analyze  in a similar way.
 The second element of the fronting diphthongs can be fricated . In emphatic speech an epenthetic schwa can follow the fricative. However, close vowels in closely related Swedish have also been reported to end in a fricative (as in   'strainer'), but the fricative element is typically analyzed as a part of the vowel. Frication of word-final close monophthongs accompanied with devoicing of the fricative element has been reported to occur in Parisian French and Dutch, with varying degrees of frequency. Those are invariably analyzed as vowels, not least because they are monophthongal in other positions.
This monophthongization is reflected in spelling in the case of Swedish and Danish, where it is a part of the standard language.

The following section describe each monophthong in detail.

Phonetic realisation 
  are unrounded, whereas  are rounded:
 The close  have been variously described as protruded  and compressed  as well as compressed  and protruded . The backness of  has also been variously described as central  and near-front .
 The close back  are compressed .
 The mid  are protruded .
 The height and backness of Norwegian vowels is as follows:
  have been variously described as near-close  and close .
  are phonetically close .
  is mid front .
  are close-mid .  is front, yet  has been variously described as front  and central .
  has been variously described as open-mid front  and mid central .
  has been variously described as near-open back  and close-mid back .
  has been variously described as mid back  and close-mid back .
  have often been described as near-open front .
  are open back .

Symbols 
This article uses the former set.
This article uses .
This article uses .

Accent

Norwegian is a stress-accent language, but has elements of pitch accent, with two distinct pitch patterns. They are used to differentiate polysyllabic words with otherwise identical pronunciation. Although difference in spelling occasionally allows the words to be distinguished in the written language (such as ), in most cases the minimal pairs are written alike. For example, in most Norwegian dialects, the word  ('pronounce') is pronounced using tone 1, while  ('pronunciation') uses tone 2.

There are significant variations in the realization of the pitch accent between dialects. In most of Eastern Norway, including the capital Oslo, the so-called low pitch dialects are spoken. In these dialects, accent 1 uses a low flat pitch in the first syllable, while accent 2 uses a high, sharply falling pitch in the first syllable and a low pitch in the beginning of the second syllable. In both accents, these pitch movements are followed by a rise of intonational nature (phrase accent), the size (and presence) of which signals emphasis/focus and which corresponds in function to the normal accent in languages that lack lexical tone, such as English. That rise culminates in the final syllable of an accentual phrase, while the fall to utterance-final low pitch that is so common in most languages is either very small or absent. On the other hand, in most of western and northern Norway (the so-called high-pitch dialects) accent 1 is falling, while accent 2 is rising in the first syllable and falling in the second syllable or somewhere around the syllable boundary.

Accent 1 generally occurs in words that were monosyllabic in Old Norse, and accent 2 in words that were polysyllabic.

Tonal accents and morphology 
In many dialects, the accents take on a significant role in marking grammatical categories. Thus, the ending (T1)—en implies determinate form of a masculine monosyllabic noun (  'boat', 'car'), whereas (T2)-en denotes either determinate form of a masculine bisyllabic noun or an adjectivised noun/verb (  'mature'). Similarly, the ending (T1)—a denotes feminine singular determinate monosyllabic nouns (  'book',   'root') or neuter plural determinate nouns (  'houses',   'lights'), whereas the ending (T2)—a denotes the preterite of weak verbs (  'made a mess',   'housed'), and feminine singular determinate bisyllabic nouns (  'bucket',   'square').

In Eastern Norwegian the tone difference may also be applied to groups of words, with different meaning as a result.  for example, means 'grow anew' when pronounced with tone 1 , but 'grow over' when pronounced with tone 2 . In other parts of Norway, this difference is achieved instead by the shift of stress (  vs.  ).

In compound words 
In a compound word, the pitch accent is lost on one of the elements of the compound (the one with weaker or secondary stress), but the erstwhile tonic syllable retains the full length (long vowel or geminate consonant) of a stressed syllable.

Monosyllabic tonal accents 
In a few dialects, mainly in and near Nordmøre, the monosyllabic tonal opposition is also represented in final syllables with secondary stress, as well as double tone designated to single syllables of primary stress in polysyllabic words. In practice, this means that one gets minimal pairs like:  ('the rooster') vs.  ('get him inside');  ('in the well') vs.  ('her well');  ('sheriff') vs.  ('the sheriff'). Amongst the various views on how to interpret this situation, the most promising one may be that the words displaying these complex tones have an extra mora. This mora may have little or no effect on duration and dynamic stress, but is represented as a tonal dip.

Other dialects with tonal opposition in monosyllabic words have done away with vowel length opposition. Thus, the words  ('dare') vs.  ('cradle') have merged into  in the dialect of Oppdal.

Loss of tonal accents 
Some forms of Norwegian have lost the tonal accent opposition. This includes mainly parts of the area around (but not including) Bergen; the Brønnøysund area; to some extent, the dialect of Bodø; and, also to various degrees, many dialects between Tromsø and the Russian border. Faroese and Icelandic, which have their main historical origin in Old Norse, also show no tonal opposition. It is, however, not clear whether these languages lost the tonal accent or whether the tonal accent was not yet there when these languages started their separate development. Standard Danish, Rigsdansk, replaces tonal accents with the stød, whilst some southern, insular dialects of Danish preserve the tonal accent to different degrees. The Finland Swedish dialects also lack a tonal accent; no such phenomenon exists in Finnish.

Pulmonic ingressive 
The same phenomenon occurs across the other Scandinavian languages, and can also be found in German, French, Finnish and Japanese, to name a few.

Sample
The sample text is a reading of the first sentence of The North Wind and the Sun by a 47-year-old professor from Oslo's Nordstrand borough.

Phonetic transcription

Orthographic version

See also
 Norwegian dialects
 Danish dialects
 Danish phonology
 Swedish phonology

Notes

References

Further reading

 
 
 
Haugen, Einer (1967). "On the Rules of Norwegian Tonality". Language Vol. 43, No. 1 (Mar., 1967), pp. 185–202.
 
 
 

Norwegian language
Germanic phonologies